Honnavile is a village in Shimoga district in the central part of the state of Karnataka.  This place is located 2 km from state highway BH road.  Shimul or Shimoga Milk Union, upcoming IT park near Machenahalli, and  Malnad Cancer Hospital are the prominent landmarks.

The village code is 01275100, registered at Ministry of Home Affairs website.

References

External links
 Censusindia.gov.in
 Indiamapped.com

Villages in Shimoga district